Boys in Heat is the second album by the American glam metal band Britny Fox, released in 1989. After this album, singer "Dizzy" Dean Davidson left the group and formed the band "Blackeyed Susan". He was replaced by singer Tommy Paris. The album debuted at No. 149 on the Billboard 200 albums chart dated November 25, 1989, and peaked at No. 79 the following week, staying there for 3 weeks. The song "Hair of the Dog" was originally recorded by Nazareth on the album Hair of the Dog (1975).

Track listing

Personnel
Band members
 "Dizzy" Dean Davidson - lead vocals, rhythm guitar, lead guitar on track 8, harmonica
 Michael Kelly Smith - lead guitars, backing vocals
 Billy Childs - bass, keyboards, backing vocals
 Johnny Dee - drums, backing vocals, cowbell and tambourine in "Hair of the Dog"

Production
Neil Kernon - producer, engineer, mixing
Chris Trevett - engineer, mixing
Oz Fritz, Paul Berry, Dan Gellert - engineers
Howie Weinberg - mastering at Masterdisk, New York

References

External links
Heavy Harmonies page

Britny Fox albums
1989 albums
Albums produced by Neil Kernon
Columbia Records albums